Ethnic Minority Party may refer to:

The defunct Ethnic Minority Party of New Zealand
An alternative name for the Minority Party (Denmark)
An alternative name for the National Minorities Party of India